Revolution Overdrive: Songs of Liberty is a soundtrack to the 2010 video game StarCraft II: Wings of Liberty. The album features original and cover songs heard in JoeyRay's bar, a bar in the video game. It is the second soundtrack to the game; the first features the game's original score. A vinyl record version of the soundtrack was originally released for BlizzCon 2010. The dual sided record featured 6 tracks on A-side and 5 on B-side. CD and iTunes LP versions of the album were released later that year. These versions feature an additional 3 tracks, and the iTunes version includes extra features, including the StarCraft II: Wings of Liberty trailer, fictional biographies for all the artists on the album (most of which are Blizzard Entertainment house bands), as well as a list of cocktails made in JoeyRays's bar.

Track listing

Vinyl version
A-side
"Jem's Tune" by Big Tuna
"Suspicious Minds" by The Bourbon Cowboys
"Zerg, Shotgun, and You" by Whiteboy James and the Blues Express
"Dim Lights, Thick Smoke (And Loud, Loud Music)" by Big Tuna
"Raw Power" by Romeo Delta
"An American Trilogy" by Brian Bode
B-side
"Free Bird" by The Blasters
"Rumble" by The Dirty Knobs
"Excuse Me for Scribblin'" by Whiteboy James and the Blues Express
"Sweet Home Alabama" by Big Tuna
"Terran Up the Night" by Level 80 Elite Tauren ChieftainAdditional tracks on the CD and iTunes versions
"Most Wanted" by StarCraft Terran Band"Blood and Glory" by StarCraft Terran Band"Suspicious Minds (Black Label)" by The Bourbon Cowboys''

References

2010 albums